Walter Runciman, 1st Baron Runciman (6 July 1847 – 13 August 1937) was an English and Scottish shipping magnate. He was born in the Scottish town of Dunbar. 
He was the fourth son of Walter Runciman, master of a schooner and later a member of the coastguard, and Jane, oldest daughter of John Finlay, shipowner, also of Dunbar. The family moved to the coastguard station at Cresswell, Northumberland, because his father was appointed a position there. After attending a church school, the younger Walter ran away from home to work at sea in 1859.

This explains why he was referred to by his grandson Steven as "a Geordie of Scots descent who ran away to sea at 11, was a master mariner by 21 and founded a shipping line", and, usefully for historians of a related area, Runciman wrote several books based on his years at sea. He also served briefly as a Liberal Member of Parliament.

In 1889, Runciman founded the South Shields Shipping Company, based in the port of South Shields, on the south bank at the mouth of the River Tyne, which was then part of County Durham but now in Tyne and Wear.  Walter Runciman was Managing Director and Secretary, and John Elliott was the chairman.  In 1892 the company offices moved up the River Tyne to the city-port of Newcastle.  In April 1897 the company changed its name to Moor Line Ltd.  Runciman and his son, who had carried on business as partners in Runciman and Co, were appointed Managing Directors of Moor Line.  Elliott died in 1898 and the elder Runciman held the position of Chairman until his death in 1937.

Runciman was created a baronet in 1906, and served as Liberal MP for Hartlepool from 1914 to 1918. In 1910 he wrote "The Tragedy of St. Helena", an account of Napoleon Bonaparte's exile and death. In 1933, he was raised to the peerage as Baron Runciman of Shoreston.  Four years later his son, the long-serving MP Walter Runciman (1870–1949), followed him into the House of Lords with the title Walter Runciman, 1st Viscount Runciman of Doxford.

A large inheritance bestowed to his grandson Steven Runciman, enabled him to become an independent scholar who travelled widely and was a leading scholar of the Crusades.

References

External links 

 
 Sir Walter Runciman (1847-1937) Royal Museums Greenwich, portrait and biography
 
 
 

1847 births
1937 deaths
Walter Runciman, 1st Baron Runciman
Liberal Party (UK) MPs for English constituencies
UK MPs 1910–1918
UK MPs who were granted peerages
Barons in the Peerage of the United Kingdom
British businesspeople in shipping
Barons created by George V